Lestes concinnus is a species of damselfly in the family Lestidae,
the spreadwings. They are so named because they rest with their wings spread. This species is known commonly as the dusky spreadwing. It is a nomadic damselfly found in India, Southeast Asia as far as New Caledonia, and northern parts of Australia.

The adult is a medium-sized damselfly about 40 millimeters long with a wingspan around 45 millimeters. It is dusky-grey on dorsal surfaces graduating to light bluish-green on the sides and beneath. In Australia, the distribution is in suitable habitat in the north-west and north-eastern part of the continent from about Broome to the south-eastern Queensland border.

This species can be found in freshwater habitat types such as river lagoons, ponds, and swamps. Its population size is unknown but it has a wide range. Threats to the species have not been assessed. It is listed as a least-concern species on the IUCN Red List.

Taxonomy
Lestes concinnus was described in 1862 jointly by Hagen and Sélys. Sélys described a new species, Lestes umbrina in 1891 from the specimens he purchased that are collected by Atkinson. Laidlaw and Fraser considered that this can be a synonym of L. concinna. M.A. Lieftinck (1934) synonymised these two species and after that these two species were considered synonyms until 1960; he himself restored the status of these as two different species. Laidlaw also described another species, Lestes thoracicus. Dumont et al. compared the specimens of these three species and concluded that they are synonyms as no structural differences were found among the color forms, varying from pale sand-coloured to greenish-blue.

Gallery

See also 
 List of odonates of India
 List of odonata of Kerala

References

Lestidae
C
Odonata of Asia
Odonata of Oceania
Odonata of Australia
Insects of Australia
Insects of Southeast Asia
Insects of India
Insects of Indonesia
Insects of New Caledonia
Least concern biota of Asia
Least concern biota of Oceania
Taxa named by Hermann August Hagen
Insects described in 1862
Damselflies